Manatuto is a city in Manatuto Municipality, East Timor.

Manatuto Vila has 3,692 inhabitants (Census 2015) and is capital of the subdistrict and district Manatuto. The capital is known for its salt production and abundance of tamarind.

Geography
Manatuto city is generally flat and low-lying, with single hills on its southern outskirts.

Dumi Huhun ( AMSL), in the city's southeast near the main road connecting Dili and Baucau, is the tallest of its hills. Another hill, Saututu Hill ( AMSL), is on the eastern side of the city, along the road connecting Manatuto and the small community of Carlilu to its south.

Governance
The city is the capital of Manatuto municipality, and is made up of four urban sucos. From west to east, the sucos are: Sau, Ailili, Aiteas, and Maabat. According to the 2010 census, urban sucos are those co-located with municipal capitals, or with certain qualities of population and social amenities. In the case of Manatuto, the city is in effect the urbanised part of the four sucos.  

Manatuto suffered an excessive amount of damage and high murder rate in 1999 compared to other locations. The town is still being re-built.

References 
 Timor-Leste at GeoHive

External links

Populated places in East Timor
Manatuto Municipality